DC Graphic Novel is a line of graphic novel trade paperbacks published from 1983 to 1986 by DC Comics.

The series generally featured stand-alone stories featuring new characters and concepts with one notable exception. The Hunger Dogs was intended by Jack Kirby and DC to serve as the end to the entire Fourth World saga. The project was mired in controversy over Kirby's insistence that the series should end with the deaths of the New Gods, which clashed with DC's demands that the characters could not be killed off.

As a result, production of the graphic novel suffered many delays and revisions. Pages and storyline elements from the unpublished "On the Road to Armagetto" were revised and incorporated into the graphic novel. Then, DC ordered the entire plot restructured which resulted in many pages of the story being rearranged out of Kirby's intended reading order. 

From 1985 to 1987, DC also published a second, related line called DC Science Fiction Graphic Novel. Rather than being original stories, the graphic novels of this line were instead adaptations of works published by well-known authors of science fiction. These were edited by Julius Schwartz, making use of his connections to recruit the famous authors whose works were adapted. This was the last editorial work Schwartz did before retiring.

These two series were DC's counterparts to Marvel Comics' Marvel Graphic Novel line.

DC Graphic Novel series

DC Science Fiction Graphic Novel series

Collected editions
 Jack Kirby's Fourth World Omnibus Volume 4 (collects DC Graphic Novel #4: "The Hunger Dogs", with some alterations to the art, 424 pages, March 2008)

References

External links
  and 
 DC Graphic Novel and DC Science Fiction Graphic Novel at Mike's Amazing World of DC Comics

1983 comics debuts
1985 comics debuts
1986 comics endings
1987 comics endings
Adaptations of works by Harlan Ellison
Adaptations of works by Ray Bradbury
Comics by Doug Moench
Comics by Jack Kirby
Comics by Keith Giffen
Comics by Pat Mills
Comics by Paul Kupperberg
DC Comics graphic novels
DC Comics lines
Defunct American comics
Lists of comics based on works
Science fiction graphic novels